Raqibul Hasan (born 8 October 1987) is a Bangladeshi international cricketer who also plays for Dhaka Division. He played in the 2006 U-19 Cricket World Cup in Sri Lanka and in 2007 became the first Bangladeshi cricketer to score a triple hundred in first-class cricket when Barisal played Sylhet Division in March 2007. Another notable achievement was a century on his first-class debut, for Bangladesh A against Zimbabwe A in February 2005. he represented Bangladesh in 2011 ICC Cricket World Cup.

Career
He made his One Day International debut for Bangladesh against South Africa in Chittagong in March 2008, where batting at number six in the order, he made 15 runs. In his second match against the same opponents, he scored 63 before hitting 89 against India in the Kitply Cup. Another half-century followed against Sri Lanka in the Asia Cup and after 14 ODIs, he had a respectable batting average of 30.61, which is only bettered by Shahriar Nafees and Shakib Al Hasan amongst Bangladesh's current players.

He made his Test debut against South Africa in November 2008.

On 10 March 2010, Raqibul announced his shock retirement from international cricket. Although he had secured his place in Bangladesh's Test squad, Raqibul's decision was made in protest to his exclusion from the ODI team that faced England and Bangladesh's squad for the 2010 T20 World Cup. A week later, Raqibul went back on his decision but his contract with the Bangladesh Cricket Board (BCB) was terminated and he was told he wouldn't be considered available to play for his country for three months.

Raqibul returned to the Bangladesh squad in June 2010 when he was called up to for his country's tour of England. His comeback from retirement lasted just one match before he was sidelined with injury. Raqibul returned to the Bangladesh side on 8 July in the first ODI against England at Trent Bridge. He made 76 in his team's innings before being struck on the foot by a delivery from James Anderson. A runner was sent for, but Raqibul was run out without facing another ball. After the match it emerged that Raqibul's toe was broken and that he would miss the rest of the tour. When the BCB announced its list of central contracts in November 2010, Raqibul has given a grade C contract.

When the squad to tour Zimbabwe for a Test and five ODIs was announced in July 2011, Mohammad Ashraful and Raqibul were competing for the same place; Ashraful was chosen over Raqibul due to his greater experience. In April 2012 the BCB announced its contracts for the coming year and Raqibul's central contract was not renewed.

He was the leading run-scorer for Mohammedan Sporting Club in the 2018–19 Dhaka Premier Division Cricket League tournament, with 781 runs in 16 matches. In November 2019, he was selected to play for the Dhaka Platoon in the 2019–20 Bangladesh Premier League.

References

External links

1987 births
Living people
Bangladeshi cricketers
Barisal Division cricketers
Bangladesh Test cricketers
Bangladesh One Day International cricketers
Bangladesh Twenty20 International cricketers
Cricketers at the 2011 Cricket World Cup
Dhaka Dominators cricketers
Prime Doleshwar Sporting Club cricketers
Gazi Tank cricketers
Mohammedan Sporting Club cricketers
Abahani Limited cricketers
Bangladesh Central Zone cricketers
Dhaka Division cricketers
Rajshahi Royals cricketers
People from Jamalpur District